Kosarek (or Kosarek Yale, Mek Kosarek) is a Papuan language used in Anggruk District, Yahukimo Regency, Highland Papua.

Further reading
Heeschen, Volker. 1992. A Dictionary of the Yale (Kosarek) Language: with Sketch of Grammar and English Index. Berlin: Dietrich Reimer.
Heeschen, Volker. 2000. Die Yale-Sprache, eine Papua-Sprache. In: Ludger Hoffmann (ed.), Sprachwissenschaft: Ein Reader, 759–774. 2nd edn. Berlin: Mouton de Gruyter.

References

Mek languages